Sangvi Surya is a village in Parner taluka in Ahmednagar district of state of Maharashtra, India. The Village Sangvi Surya  is 10 km away from the famous village Nighoj, wherein Goddess Malagasy Temple is famous. The population of Sangvi Surya is about 3000 to 3500. About 30% of total population lives in Mumbai for employment prospects. Peoples are educated and have various occupations such as Government Personnel, Own Businesses and in Private Sectors.

Religion
The majority of the population in the village is Hindu.

Economy
Farming as primary occupation.
 
Most of Population stayed in the City like Pune & Mumbai. Once in a year all the people come together for the Festival called Jatra of Shah Sikandar Baba in the month of December. For this festival people travel from cities such as Pune and Mumbai. This Festival is organized in such a way that large crowds come together and enjoy it.

See also
 Parner Taluka
 Villages in Parner Taluka

References 

Villages in Parner taluka
Villages in Ahmednagar district